The Merry Farmer (German: Der fidele Bauer) is a 1927 German silent film directed by Franz Seitz and starring Carmen Boni, Werner Krauss and S.Z. Sakall. It is based on the 1907 operetta of the same title. A 1951 film adaptation was also made.

The film's sets were designed by the art director Willi Herrmann.

Cast
In alphabetical order
 Achmed Beh
 Carmen Boni as Spreewälderin  
 Hans Brausewetter 
 Ivy Close
 Harry Frank 
 Werner Krauss as Bauer Mathäus Reuther  
 André Nox as Prof. von Grumow  
 Leo Peukert 
 S.Z. Sakall as Dorfpolizist  
 Simone Vaudry 
 Peter Voß 
 Mathias Wieman as Sohn Stephan Reuther

References

Bibliography
 Bock, Hans-Michael & Bergfelder, Tim. The Concise CineGraph. Encyclopedia of German Cinema. Berghahn Books, 2009.

External links
 
 

1927 films
Films of the Weimar Republic
Films directed by Franz Seitz
German silent feature films
UFA GmbH films
Films based on operettas
German black-and-white films
Films scored by Leo Fall